The Balmain Power Station was located at Iron Cove,  from Sydney in New South Wales, Australia. The station no longer exists and residential properties now occupy the site. This plant is often confused with the White Bay Power Station, the remains of which are still standing in Rozelle.

History 

In 1903, the Public Health Department directed Balmain Council to find alternatives to the open tip dumping of local rubbish. The council invited tenders for a combined garbage destructor and power plant and on 30 September 1909, the newly constructed power station 'A' commenced operation. Power came from 2 Belliss and Morcom high-speed engines coupled to 5000-volt BTH generators. The output was 500 kW from one machine and 250 kW from the other. Steam came from two Babcox and Wilcox chain grate coal-fired boilers plus the destructor boiler. In 1913 two Willans & Robinson 900 kW turbo generators were added. These were further accompanied by a Curtis-BTH 2.5 MW turbine (Number 1) in 1914. A Curtis-BTH 3 MW machine (Number 2) was added in 1922. A 7.5 MW Fraser & Chalmers machine was added in 1923. Steam came from additional Babcox and Wilcox chain grate boilers. This brought "A" Station capacity to 15 MW. In 1928 a 10 MW Curtis - BTH machine (Number 3) was installed, and in 1935 an 18.75 MW AEG turbine (Number 4) was added, bringing total capacity to 41 MW. In 1947 and 1953 the first two Babcock+ Wilcox boilers were transferred to Muswellbrook power station.

'B' Station:- A second phase of construction took place between 1940 and 1950. A 9.4 MW English Electric back pressure turbine (Number 5) was installed. This was a high-pressure turbine that sent its exhaust steam to the "A" Station lower-pressure turbines. 1952 saw the addition of a 25 MW Parsons steam turbine (Number 6). Two more Parsons 25 MW machines (Number 7 and Number 8) were added by 1956. Steam for machines 5–8 was supplied by four high-pressure Babcox and Wilcox pulverized coal boilers. This doubled the generation capacity of the plant, bringing it to 126.2 MW.

The original station was a private facility, owned by the Electric Light and Power Supply Corporation (EL&PSC), which supplied electricity to consumers and businesses in Balmain, Leichhardt, Ashfield, Newtown and Petersham. It also supplied power to large enterprises in the local area including Mort's Dock and the Balmain Colliery.

The Balmain Electric Light Company Purchase Act 1950 (NSW) enabled the acquisition of the plant by the Electricity Commission of New South Wales. A legal dispute over the valuation of the power station then ensued which delayed the sale until January 1957 when the plant changed hands for £600,000. The plant continued to supply power until 1976 when it was decommissioned.

Today 

The power station was demolished in 1998, and the Balmain Shores apartment complex was built on the site. Prior to its demolition, the 'B' Station was used as the set of an episode of the ABC program Police Rescue. 

Only two of the original buildings remain as part of the new development:

 Power Station 'A' pump house — This 1934 building is located on the foreshore and was used to house the generators powering the electric pumps taking cold water from the river to the station. The water was used to cool condensers before being pumped back to the river.

None of the original machinery exists in the well-preserved red brick building. However, the original copper letters spelling the words "Power Station" were salvaged from the main building prior to demolition and are hung at the eastern end of the pump house.

 Administration block — The former administration block was built in the 1930s and housed offices for the EL&PSC. The building has been renamed The Villa and forms part of the Balmain Shores complex. It was declared a heritage building prior to the official re-opening in March 2003.

See also 

 Electricity
 Electricity generation
 Future energy development
 Renewable energy
 Environmental concerns with electricity generation

Notes 
 State Records NSW, Electricity Commission of New South Wales, Agency Detail
 Solling, M; Reynolds, P; Leichhardt: On the margins of the city, Allen & Unwin, 1997, .
 Pacific Power, Demolition of Balmain Power Station, Rozelle. Statement of Environmental Effects, Pacific Power Services, October 1994.
 The Balmain Association, Peninsula Observer, Volume 28, Number 6, Issue 226, December 1993.
 NSW Government - Department of Planning, Harbour Circle Walk - Loop and Alternate Walks
 On-site Information Plaques, Balmain Shores Apartment Complex, Rozelle, NSW.

External links 

 Local Images at InnerWest ImageBank
 Local History Collection, Leichhardt Council
  [CC-By-SA]

Buildings and structures demolished in 1998
Former buildings and structures in Sydney
Coal-fired power stations in New South Wales
Demolished buildings and structures in Sydney
Demolished power stations
Decommissioned power stations in New South Wales
Rozelle, New South Wales
1909 establishments in Australia
Energy infrastructure completed in 1909